The Zhongxin Bridge is a historic stone arch bridge over the South Market River in Tianning District of Changzhou, Jiangsu, China.

History
Zhongxin Bridge was built in 1918, at the dawn of the Republic of China. On 26 February 2008, it was classified as a municipal cultural relic preservation organ by the Government of Changzhou.

Gallery

References

Bridges in Jiangsu
Arch bridges in China
Bridges completed in 1918
Buildings and structures completed in 1918
1918 establishments in China